is a Japanese retired football player.

Career
Kazuki Egashira joined J3 League club Oita Trinita in 2016. On September 22, he debuted in Emperor's Cup (v Shimizu S-Pulse).

Club statistics
Updated to 23 February 2018.

References

External links
Profile at Grulla Morioka

1997 births
Living people
Association football people from Yamaguchi Prefecture
Japanese footballers
J3 League players
Oita Trinita players
Suzuka Point Getters players
Iwate Grulla Morioka players
Association football midfielders